Maurolicus is an oceanic  ray-finned fish genus which belongs in the marine hatchetfish family Sternoptychidae. They are commonly known as pearlsides, but the brilliant pearlside is the related Argyripnus iridescens. Occasionally, "bristle-mouth fishes" is used as a common name, but that usually refers to the genus Argyripnus or the family Gonostomatidae. 

Fossils of pearlsides are known from the Miocene.

Species
There are currently 15 recognized species in this genus:
 Maurolicus amethystinopunctatus Cocco, 1838
 Maurolicus australis Hector, 1875 (pennant pearlside)
 Maurolicus breviculus Parin & Kobyliansky, 1993
 Maurolicus imperatorius Parin & Kobyliansky, 1993 (Emperor seamount lightfish)
 Maurolicus inventionis Parin & Kobyliansky, 1993
 Maurolicus japonicus Ishikawa, 1915 (North Pacific lightfish)
 Maurolicus javanicus Parin & Kobyliansky, 1993 (Javan pearlside)
 Maurolicus kornilovorum Parin & Kobyliansky, 1993
 Maurolicus mucronatus Klunzinger, 1871
 Maurolicus muelleri (J. F. Gmelin, 1789) (Silvery lightfish, Mueller's pearlside, Mueller's bristle-mouth fish)
 Maurolicus parvipinnis Vaillant, 1888
 Maurolicus rudjakovi Parin & Kobyliansky, 1993
 Maurolicus stehmanni Parin & Kobyliansky, 1996
 Maurolicus walvisensis Parin & Kobyliansky, 1993
 Maurolicus weitzmani Parin & Kobyliansky, 1993 (Atlantic pearlside, Weitzman's pearlside)

References

Sternoptychidae
Extant Miocene first appearances
Marine fish genera
Ray-finned fish genera
Taxa named by Anastasio Cocco

zh:褶胸魚科#穆氏暗光魚屬(Maurolicus)